Beringius is a genus of large sea snails or true whelks, a marine gastropod molluscs in the family Buccinidae, the true whelks.

Beringius is the type genus of the subfamily Beringiinae.

Species 
According to the World Register of Marine Species the following species with valid names are included within the genus Beringius :
 Beringius aleuticus Dall, 1895
 Beringius behringii (Middendorff, 1848)
 Beringius bogasoni Warén & S. M. Smith, 2006
 Beringius crebricostatus (Dall, 1877)
 Beringius eyerdami A. G. Smith, 1959
 Beringius indentatus Dall, 1919
 Beringius kennicottii (Dall, 1871)
 Beringius marshalli Dall, 1919
 Beringius polynematicus Pilsbry, 1907
 Beringius stimpsoni (Gould, 1860)
 Beringius turtoni (Bean, 1834)
 Beringius undatus Dall, 1919

References

Buccinidae